Bad Bentheim is a railway station located in Bad Bentheim, Germany. The station was opened on 18 October 1865 and is located on the Almelo - Salzbergen railway. The train services are operated by Deutsche Bahn with NS International and the WestfalenBahn.

The station is a border station between Germany and the Netherlands. Dutch and German locomotives change here as the voltage is different in the countries. From Bad Bentheim, passengers can travel on the international service to Amsterdam. Passengers can also reach cities such as Osnabrück, Hannover and Berlin.

To the east of the station is a shunting area for the Bentheimer Eisenbahn which is a freight railway to Nordhorn and Coevorden.

Train services
The following services currently call at Bad Bentheim:

Intercity services Amsterdam Central - Amersfoort - Hengelo - Osnabrück - Hanover - Berlin
Local services:
 Hengelo - Bad Bentheim - Rheine - Osnabrück - Herford - Bielefeld
 Bad Bentheim - Quendorf - Nordhorn-Blanke - Nordhorn - Neuenhaus Süd - Neuenhaus

From December 2010 until December 2013 there was a trial with a Stoptrain service between Hengelo, Oldenzaal and Bad Bentheim, operated by Syntus as the Grensland-Express. It was cancelled in 2013 due to a lack of passengers. From December 2017, the German RB61 will be extended to Hengelo. Additionally there are plans to start passenger services between Bad Bentheim, Nordhorn and Neuenhaus.

Bus services
100 Bad Bentheim - Nordhorn - Neuenhaus - Uelsen - Wilsum - Emlichheim
200 Bad Bentheim - Nordhorn - Neuenhaus - Veldhausen - Hoogstede - Emlichheim

References

External links 
 

Railway stations in Lower Saxony
Railway stations in Germany opened in 1865
Railway stations on the Almelo - Salzbergen railway line